Tommy Gaynor (born 29 January 1963 in Limerick) was an Irish soccer player during the 1980s and 1990s.

He made his League of Ireland debut on 13 September 1981 for Limerick United before signing for Shamrock Rovers in 1982. He scored 2 goals in 3 appearances for the club in the UEFA Cup. He left to sign for Dundalk in 1983. Moved back to Limerick where he was joint top scorer in 1984–85 and top scorer in 1985–86.

He signed for Nottingham Forest in 1987 spending 5 years there before signing for Millwall in 1992.

At the City Ground he helped Forest win the Football League Cup and Full Members Cup in 1989, when they also finished third in the Football League First Division. However, he was left out of the side for the League Cup final of 1990, when Forest retained their trophy.

In his time at the City Ground, Gaynor was one of the Forest players who had to cope with the horrors of the Hillsborough disaster during the opening minutes of their FA Cup semi-final against Liverpool. Gaynor played in the rescheduled game at Old Trafford, which Liverpool won 3–1. Despite scoring regularly for the Forest first team he spent the majority of his time as a reserve player, often behind considerably less prolific strikers.

Gaynor Close is the name of the road which bears witness to the impact Tommy made on Forest's fans. 

He then returned to his homeland and despite guesting for Shelbourne in a friendly against Tottenham Hotspur he signed for Cork City in August 1993, initially on a months loan. This deal became permanent but Gaynor had a turbulent relationship with the then Bishopstown based club. In December 1994 he failed to turn up for a league game.

He signed for Athlone Town in October 1995 and scored twice on his debut. He was Athlone's top scorer that season with 12 league goals. Rejoined Cork in September 1996 but was back playing for Athlone in early 1997.

Gaynor transferred to Bohemians in February 1997 and again scored on his debut.

He had further spells with St Patrick's Athletic, where he scored against Celtic in a friendly, Limerick and Kilkenny City.

He was appointed Kilkenny City manager on 11 July 2007.

Gaynor became the first player to win the League Cup in Ireland and England.

Honours
FAI Cup:
 Limerick United – 1982
PFAI Player of the Year:
 Limerick – 1984/85
 Football League Cup
 Nottingham Forest – 1989, 1990
 Full Members Cup
 Nottingham Forest – 1989
 FAI League Cup
 Cork City – 1995

References

External links 
 
 Tommy Gaynor in 'Soccer Players' file at Limerick City Library, Ireland

1963 births
Living people
Sportspeople from Limerick (city)
Association football forwards
Republic of Ireland association footballers
Limerick F.C. players
Shamrock Rovers F.C. players
Dundalk F.C. players
Doncaster Rovers F.C. players
Nottingham Forest F.C. players
Newcastle United F.C. players
Millwall F.C. players
Derry City F.C. players
Cork City F.C. players
Athlone Town A.F.C. players
Bohemian F.C. players
St Patrick's Athletic F.C. players
Kilkenny City A.F.C. players
League of Ireland players
League of Ireland XI players
League of Ireland managers
English Football League players
Association footballers from County Limerick
Republic of Ireland football managers